Hypericum llanganaticum is a species of shrub in the family Hypericaceae. It is endemic to Ecuador. It grows in the Andes at elevations between 3000 and 4500 meters. Most collections have been made in Parque Nacional Llanganates.

References

llanganaticum
Endemic flora of Ecuador
Taxonomy articles created by Polbot